Edijs Jurēvics (sometimes anglicized as Eddie Jurevics; born 18 December 1989 in Jelgava) is a Latvian rock singer, guitarist, clarinetist, pianist and songwriter. He is the lead singer of the Latvian rock band Crow Mother.

He began his music career in 2008 as the lead vocalist of the rock band Second File, with which he released two songs Baltā Princese and Tava Patiesība.

His second band, Blacksmith, released two studio singles Saturday's Night and Paralelitāte before disbanding in 2012.

In 2012 Eddie Joined musicians like Jānis Andžāns, Edgars Briedis and Mārtiņš Vilšķērsts and founded an alternative rock band Crow Mother. Currently, they have already released two studio albums.

Eddie's debut solo single, Kur Laime Ir, was released in September 2018

His second band Blacksmith reunited and change the band name to Maldi and released patriotic single Zemes Balss in November 2018.

Discography

Radio singles

TV

Shows

References

1989 births
Living people
People from Jelgava
21st-century Latvian male singers